This is a list of high schools in the U.S. state of Indiana.

A

Adams County

Allen County

B

Bartholomew County

Benton County

Blackford County

Boone County

Brown County

C

Carroll County

Cass County

Clark County

Clay County

Clinton County

Crawford County

D

Daviess County

Dearborn County

Decatur County

DeKalb County

Delaware County

Dubois County

E

Elkhart County

F

Fayette County

Floyd County

Fountain County

Franklin County

Fulton County

G

Gibson County

Grant County

* Oak Hill High School is located in Grant County, though its mailing address is in Converse, which is in Miami County.

Greene County

H

Hamilton County

Hancock County

Harrison County

Hendricks County

Henry County

Howard County

Huntington County

J

Jackson County

Jasper County

Jay County

Jefferson County

Jennings County

Johnson County

K

Knox County

Kosciusko County

L

Lagrange County

Lake County

LaPorte County

Lawrence County

M

Madison County

Marion County

Marshall County

Martin County

Miami County

* Though Oak Hill's mailing address is Converse, the actual school grounds are located in Grant County.

Monroe County

Montgomery County

Morgan County

N

Newton County

Noble County

O

Ohio County

Orange County

Owen County

P

Parke County

Perry County

Pike County

Porter County

Posey County

Pulaski County

Putnam County

R

Randolph County

Ripley County

Rush County

S

St. Joseph County

Scott County

Shelby County

Spencer County

Starke County

Steuben County

Sullivan County

Switzerland County

T

Tippecanoe County

Tipton County

U

Union County

V

Vanderburgh County

Vermillion County

Virtual schools

Vigo County

W

Wabash County

Warren County

Warrick County

Washington County

Wayne County

Wells County

White County

Whitley County

See also
List of school districts in Indiana

External links
 Indiana Department of Education
 Indiana K-12 web sites
 Indiana school data
 Indiana School Directory

 
Indiana High School Athletic Association
Indiana, High schools
High schools